Prem Kumar  is an Indian politician. He is a member of Bihar Legislative Assembly elected eight times from Gaya Town assembly constituency.

He has completed his Ph.D. from Magadh University in 1999.

Prem was elected the leader of the opposition in the Bihar assembly formed after assembly election in October, 2015.

References

Bihar MLAs 2010–2015
State cabinet ministers of Bihar
Living people
People from Gaya, India
Magadh University alumni
Leaders of the Opposition in the Bihar Legislative Assembly
Bihar MLAs 2015–2020
1960 births
Bharatiya Janata Party politicians from Bihar
Bihar MLAs 2020–2025